Rubén Roca (born 12 December 1940) is a Cuban former swimmer. He competed in two events at the 1960 Summer Olympics.

References

1940 births
Living people
Cuban male swimmers
Olympic swimmers of Cuba
Swimmers at the 1960 Summer Olympics
Sportspeople from Santiago de Cuba
20th-century Cuban people